Senator Sorenson or Sorensen may refer to:

Albert Sorensen (born 1932), Iowa State Senate
Kent Sorenson (born 1972), Iowa State Senate
Liane Sorenson (born 1947), Delaware State Senate
Pete Sorenson (born 1952), Oregon State Senate
Sheila Sorensen (born 1947), Idaho State Senate